Juan Álvaro José Gaxiola Robles (26 January 1937 – 18 August 2003) was a Mexican diver. He competed at the 1960, 1964 and 1968 Olympics in the 3 m springboard and 10 m platform and won a silver medal in the platform in 1968, in Mexico City. He also finished fourth in the springboard in 1960.

Gaxiola lived for many years in the United States and returned to Mexico only in the 1990s. He competed in diving for Ann Arbor High School and then for the University of Michigan, where he studied civil engineering.

Gaxiola died of cancer in his native Guadalajara, aged 66. He was survived by wife Sylvia Wydell and three children, Ingi, Michelle, and Annika.

References

1937 births
2003 deaths
Mexican male divers
Olympic silver medalists for Mexico
Sportspeople from Guadalajara, Jalisco
Divers at the 1960 Summer Olympics
Divers at the 1964 Summer Olympics
Divers at the 1968 Summer Olympics
Olympic divers of Mexico
Michigan Wolverines men's swimmers
Olympic medalists in diving
Medalists at the 1968 Summer Olympics
Pan American Games gold medalists for Mexico
Pan American Games silver medalists for Mexico
Pan American Games medalists in diving
Divers at the 1963 Pan American Games
Divers at the 1959 Pan American Games
Medalists at the 1959 Pan American Games
Medalists at the 1963 Pan American Games
20th-century Mexican people
21st-century Mexican people